Thomas Grantham (1641–1718) was an English tobacco trader and sailor.

Thomas Grantham may also refer to:

Thomas Grantham (died 1592), MP for Great Grimsby (UK Parliament constituency)
Thomas Grantham (died 1558), MP for Lincoln
Thomas Grantham (died 1630)
Thomas Grantham (Parliamentarian) (1612–1655)
Thomas Grantham (Baptist) (1634–1692), English minister